Traci Townsend is a 2006 comedy film directed by Craig Ross Jr. and starring Jazsmin Lewis and Mari Morrow. It was written by Bobby Thompson, who was also a producer of the film.

Premise
A beautiful and successful journalist interviews her three previous boyfriends to find out why they never proposed. Each distinctly different interview comically teaches Traci more about herself than she would care to know.

Cast
Jazsmin Lewis as Traci Townsend
Mari Morrow as Sylvia
Richard T. Jones as Travis
Jay Acovone as Jesse "The Boss"
Victor Williams as Darrell
Suzanne Whang as Rosa
Marlon Young as Pierre
Amy Hunter as Vick
Aaron D. Spears as Dante
Myquan Jackson as Jay

Accolades
2006 Boston International Film Festival
Best Acting Performance — Jazsmin Lewis (winner)

2006 Hollywood Black Film Festival
Audience Choice Award (winner)

References

External links
 
 

2006 films
2006 comedy films
African-American comedy films
2000s English-language films
2000s American films